Buddy Clinton (August 7, 1997 – January 2, 2002), a male chocolate-colored Labrador Retriever, was one of two pets kept by the Clinton family while Bill Clinton was President of the United States. The Clintons' other pet was a cat named Socks.

Life

Clinton acquired Buddy as a three-month-old puppy from Caroline County, Maryland, in December 1997. He named him after his late great-uncle, Henry Oren "Buddy" Grisham, who had died the previous June and whom Clinton often cited as a major influence on his life.
Socks did not get along with the frisky Buddy, so the White House had to keep the two in separate quarters. Since this arrangement would be no longer possible in the Clintons' smaller home in New York, Socks was left under the care of Bill Clinton's secretary, Betty Currie.

Death
According to a police report, Buddy was killed by a car while "playfully chasing a contractor" who had left the Clinton home in Chappaqua, New York, on January 2, 2002. The Clintons were not home at the time of the accident; their home was being watched by Secret Service agents. The agents rushed Buddy to an animal hospital where he was pronounced dead.

In June 2002, Clinton acquired another chocolate Lab whom he named "Seamus".

Cultural references
First Lady Hillary Clinton wrote a children's book called Dear Socks, Dear Buddy: Kids' Letters to the First Pets in 1998. It included excerpts from more than 50 letters written to the First Pets by children and more than 80 photographs of Socks and Buddy.

Buddy was a central character in Rick Cleveland's 2005 one-man show My Buddy Bill, relating the writer's fictional friendship with Bill Clinton, which began when both men discovered their common interest in dogs.

See also
United States presidential pets
List of individual dogs
List of Labrador Retrievers
Socks (cat)

References

External links

1997 animal births
2002 animal deaths
Bill Clinton
Caroline County, Maryland
Hillary Clinton
Road incident deaths in New York (state)
United States presidential dogs